Huxley is a small rural village and former civil parish, now in the parish of Hargrave and Huxley, in the Cheshire West and Chester district, and ceremonial county of Cheshire in England. In 2001 it had a population of 220, increasing to 251 at the 2011 Census. The civil parish was abolished in 2015 to form Hargrave and Huxley and Tattenhall and District.

It is home to Huxley Primary School.

See also

Listed buildings in Huxley, Cheshire
Lower Huxley Hall
Higher Huxley Hall

References

External links

Villages in Cheshire
Former civil parishes in Cheshire
Cheshire West and Chester